Histura brunneotypa is a species of moth of the family Tortricidae. It is found in Argentina.

The wingspan is about 16 mm. The ground colour of the forewings is pale grey-brown, but greyer in the basal half of the wing and slightly tinged with reddish in the distal half. The hindwings are grey-brown.

Etymology
The species name refers to the colouration of the forewings and is derived from Latin brunneus (meaning brown) and Greek typos (meaning a picture).

References

Moths described in 2007
Polyorthini